Centreville, Ontario may refer to several places:
Centreville, Bruce County, Ontario
Centreville, Elgin County, Ontario (now known as West Elgin)
Centreville, Grey County, Ontario
Centreville, Lennox and Addington County, Ontario
Centreville, Oxford County, Ontario
Centreville, Waterloo Regional Municipality, Ontario

It may also refer to several places:
Centreville Amusement Park, on the Toronto Islands